The March 77S was a Group 6 prototype race car, designed, developed and built by British manufacturer March Engineering, for sports car racing, in 1977. It was essentially a modified version and evolution of both the March 74S and the March 75S. It competed in the revived Can-Am series, entering in the Under 2-Liter class for the 1977 championship.

References

Sports prototypes
Can-Am cars